Helmbrechts is a town in the district of Hof, in Bavaria, Germany. It is situated on the Southern edge of the Frankenwald, 20 km southwest of Hof.

History
The first documented mention of Helmbrechts dates back to 1232. Township was granted to Helmbrechts by Count Friedrich V. of Nürnberg in the year 1422. Helmbrechts has been in Bavarian rule since 1810, and eventually became part of the German Empire in 1871, and then the German republic after World War I. During World War II, Helmbrechts was the location of the Helmbrechts concentration camp, a women's subcamp of the Flossenbürg concentration camp, which was founded near Helmbrechts in the summer of 1944. Over 1,200 women, mostly from German-occupied Poland, Soviet Union, Czechoslovakia and Hungary, were imprisoned in the subcamp and used as forced labour. Dozens of prisoners died, including some being beaten to death or hung after escape attempts. Around 200 women died in a death march, when the Germans evacuated the subcamp in April 1945. Following World War II, the town formed part of West Germany until 1990.

Geography

The city districts

With the local government reorganization in 1972, the following villages were merged to Helmbrechts' district:

Weavers‘ cottage 
Kleinschwarzenbach is a small village belonging to Helmbrechts with a long tradition in weaving. One of the weavers‘ cottages of pre-industrial times could be visited.

References

External links
 The Death March through Helmbrechts to Volary, at Yad Vashem website

Hof (district)